Kennedy is both a terminal and interchange station on Line 2 Bloor–Danforth and Line 3 Scarborough of the Toronto subway system. Opened in 1980, it is located east of the Kennedy Road and Eglinton Avenue intersection.

The station's main complex consists of four floors with wheelchair accessible entrances. The ground level is the bus terminal surrounded with ten platforms that serve eleven Toronto Transit Commission (TTC) bus routes. Wi-Fi service is available at this station.

Construction to expand the station began in 2017 to add a platform for the future Line 5 Eglinton, which will terminate at the station when its first phase opens in 2023. Further changes to the station are expected to take place during the 2020s as Line 3 is scheduled to be decommissioned and Line 2 is set to be extended to Scarborough City Centre. Until then, it will be the first station in the subway system to be an interchange for three lines.

Station complex

The station is located south of Eglinton Avenue, east of Kennedy Road. The station complex consists of four levels. The S-series trains of Line 3 Scarborough ascend via a bridge to the platform located at the top level of the station complex. The ground floor (third floor) consists of ten bus platforms surrounding the main building. Four satellite pedestrian entrances to the station can be found at the South Parking Lot, next to the Don Montgomery Community Centre, at the service road of Eglinton Avenue, and the passenger pick-up and drop-off roundabout on Transway Crescent. Below the ground level is the concourse that spans the length of the station, connecting to all pedestrian entrances. Below the concourse is the platform for subway trains on the Line 2 Bloor–Danforth.

Although Line 3 trains are bidirectionally-operated metro trains, the tracks for Line 3 extends beyond the top floor platform into an above-ground turning loop, similar to those found on the Toronto streetcar system. This was because Line 3 had been planned as a dedicated right-of-way streetcar line, rather than a metro line. As such, the top-floor platform was designed to operate streetcars. Line 3 was later built as a medium-capacity rail transport line to use the Intermediate Capacity Transit System train models built by Bombardier Transportation. The line began using two-car trains, which were able to travel along the turning loop, but was later converted to use four-car trains, which could not be operated along the tight loop. Thus, the use of the loop for reversals was discontinued after 1988, although the loop's elevated structure remains over the passenger pick-up and drop-off building and is now occasionally used as a tail track to store trains. The station platform was reduced to a single track and began using the Spanish solution of unloading and boarding passengers at Kennedy. Original floor finishing and platform edge markings for the planned light rail can also be seen along the current tracks.

Four park and ride lots, that have a combined total of 729 spaces, are located around the station.

Station expansion 
 Kennedy is being expanded to become the eastern terminus of Line 5 Eglinton.

The main entrance to Kennedy station at the southwest corner of West Service Road and Transway Crescent has been demolished, and will be replaced by a new entrance to access the Line 5 concourse to be located one level above the Line 5 platforms. Two elevators will connect the Line 5 concourse to the Line 5 platform. Two north–south passages will connect the Line 5 concourse to the existing Line 2 concourse. There will be few changes to the Line 2 concourse. A secondary entrance on the east side of the existing GO rail corridor serves as the main entrance to the GO station.

As part of a program to install artworks at major interchange stations along Line 5 Eglinton, Kennedy station will feature two artworks. A mural titled Reorganization of One Hedge by artist Dagmara Genda will consist of photographs of leaves taken from the same hedge, that will be printed on the glass of a skylight. A second artwork titled Locations of Meaning by artist Joseph Kosuth will consist of etched tiles with stainless steel inserts, each spelling the word "meaning" in one of 72 languages.

Surface connections 

While the subway is closed, passengers may board buses outside the station near Transway Crescent. TTC routes serving the station include:

References

External links 

 published by the Crosstown project about an art piece to be installed at Kennedy station

Line 3 Scarborough stations
Line 2 Bloor–Danforth stations
Line 5 Eglinton stations
Railway stations in Canada opened in 1980